Saba is a surname or given name.

People with the given name or nickname Saba include the following, ordered by year of birth:

 Saba (rapper) (born 1994), American rapper and record producer
 Saba or Sabbas the Goth (334–372), Christian saint
 Lady Saba Holland (1802–1866), English biographer of her father, Sydney Smith
 Saba Kadisha ("Holy Grandfather"; 1826–1930), Israeli rabbi, kabbalist and rosh yeshiva 
 Saba Raleigh (1866–1923), born Isabel Ellissen, English actress
 Saba Doak (1879–1918), American soprano singer 
 Sabá Sueyro (1889–1943), Argentine politician
 Saba Habachy (1897–1996), Egyptian official, oil industry consultant and international lawyer
 Saba Youakim (1914–2003), Archbishop of the Melkite Greek Catholic Archeparchy of Petra and Philadelphia in Amman
 Saba Georgios (1933–1933), Cypriot football striker
 Saba Dashtyari (1953–2011), Baloch academic
 Saba Haftbaradaran (1982–2011), student killed in an attack on Camp Ashraf, Iraq
 Saba Hameed (born 1957), Pakistani actress
 Saba Mahmood (1961–2018), Pakistan-born American professor of anthropology at the University of California
 Saba Rajendran (born 1961), Indian politician and incumbent Member of Neyveli legislative assembly of Tamil Nadu
 Moisés Saba Masri (1963–2010), Jewish (of Syrian extract) Mexican businessman 
 Daud Shah Saba (born 1964), Afghan politician
 Saba Sadiq (born 1966), Pakistani politician, former Member of the Provincial Assembly of the Punjab
 Saba Karim (born 1967), Indian cricketer
 Saba Douglas-Hamilton (born 1970), Kenyan wildlife conservationist and television presenter
 Saba Anglana (born 1970), Somali-Italian actress and singer
 Saba Zafar (born 1973), Indian member of Bihar Legislative Assembly and a leader of Bharatiya Janata Party
 Saba Sahar (born 1975), Afghan actress, and the country's first female film director and producer
 Saba Mubarak (born 1976), Jordanian actress and producer
 Saba Kamali (born 1976), Iranian actress
 Saba Ali Khan (born 1976), Indian jewelry designer and mutawalli (Chief Trustee) of the Royal Trust established in Bhopal
 Saba Soomekh (born 1976), Iranian-born American academic
 Saba Homayoon (born 1977), Canadian-Iranian actress
 Saba Saba ( Alex Kirya, born 1977), Ugandan hip-hop artist
 Saba Kidane (born 1978), Eritrean journalist, poet, and political activist
 Saba Masoumian (born 1982), Iranian-born Italian artist 
 Saba Qamar (born 1984), Pakistani model
 Saba Anjum Karim (born 1985), former member of the Indian women's hockey team
 Saba Ahmed (born 1985), American founder and president of the Republican Muslim Coalition
 Saba Gavashelishvili (born 1987), Georgian judoka
 Saba Aziz (born 1988), former Pakistan number one women's tennis player
 Sabas Saleel (born 1990), Indian footballer
 Saba Tavadze (born 1993), Georgian Football midfielder 
 Saba Lobzhanidze (born 1994), Georgian football player
 Saba Azad, Indian actress and musician
 Saba Azarpeik, Iranian female journalist of the Iranian reformist movement
 Saba Aziz, Pakistani tennis player
 Saba Dewan, Indian documentary film maker
 Saba Hamedy, American news editor at Huffington Post
 Saba Imtiaz, Pakistani journalist and music critic
 Saba Jallas, Yemeni artist, whose work gained recognition during the Yemeni Civil War
 Saba Komkova, Soviet female sprint canoer who competed in the early 1980s
 Saba Soomekh, Iranian-born American female professor and author
 Saba Valadkhan, Iranian American biomedical scientist

People with the surname Saba include:

 Abdullah ibn Saba', dubious 7th-century Islamic figure associated with the group called the Sabaʾiyya
 Abraham Saba (1440–1508), Spanish rabbi
 Isak Saba (1875–1921), Sami teacher and politician
 Umberto Saba (1883–1957), Italian poet and novelist
 Pierre-Macario Saba (1873–1943), Archbishop of the Melkite Greek Catholic Archeparchy of Aleppo
 Abolhasan Saba (1902–1957), Iranian composer and teacher of Persian traditional music
 Shōichi Saba (1919–2012), one of the pioneers of postwar Japanese manufacturing
 Fakhereh Saba (1920–2007), the first female opera singer in Iran
 Elias Saba (born 1932), Lebanese politician and economist
 Joe Saba (born 1940), Australian fashion designer of Lebanese descent
 Geoffrey Saba (born 1946), Australian classical pianist of Lebanese descent
 Juan Carlos Oblitas Saba (born 1951), Peruvian footballer
 Bassam Saba (1958–2020), Lebanese musician
 Moisés Saba (1963–2010), Mexican business tycoon
 Gian Franco Saba (born 1968), Italian Roman Catholic Archbishop of Sassari
 Joseph Saba (composer) (born 1971), American composer
 Nicole Saba (born 1974), Lebanese singer and actress
 Christian Saba (born 1978), Ghanaian footballer
 Hussain Taher Al Saba (born 1979), Saudi Arabian long jumper
 Gustavo Saba (born 1979), Paraguayan rally driver 
 Ahmad Saba'a (born 1980), Arab-Israeli footballer
 Sohana Saba (born 1986), Bangladeshi television and film actress
 Vítor Saba (born 1990), Brazilian footballer
 Dia Saba (born 1992), Israeli footballer, cousin of Ahmad Saba'a
 Steeven Saba (born 1993), Haitian football midfielder
 Nathalie Saba (born 1998), Egyptian-Lebanese singer

See also
 Sabas
 Sabbas

Arabic feminine given names
Arabic-language surnames
Iranian feminine given names
Georgian masculine given names
Surnames of Lebanese origin
Iranian-language surnames